Ricciarda Malaspina (1497 – 15 June 1553) was an Italian noblewoman, who was marquise of Massa and lady of Carrara from 1519 to 1546, and again from May 1547 until her death. She was ultimately succeeded by her younger son Alberico I.

Life

Born in Massa, she was the daughter of Antonio Alberico II Malaspina and Lucrezia d'Este. His father in 1481 had become marquis of Massa and lord of Carrara, together with his brother Francesco. After rebelling and defeating the latter, and being heirless, Antonio Alberico named his first daughter, Eleonora, as heir of his lands. Elenora was married to Scipione Fieschi, count of Lavagna, but she died in 1516. The following year Fieschi would marry again, to Ricciarda. The marriage lasted for four years, until he also died heirless.

After Antonio Alberico's death in 1519, notwithstanding her being a woman and in spite of the Salic law, Ricciarda succeeded in maintaining control over his states. The following year she married Lorenzo Cybo, a Genoese nobleman who was a grandson of Pope Innocent VIII and Lorenzo de' Medici, thus founding the Cybo-Malaspina family, who would hold Massa and Carrara until 1829.

In a period in which Italy was overrun by the war between France, the Holy Roman Empire, and the Italian states, she allied with Emperor Charles V. In 1530, she therefore obtained the imperial permission to associate her husband in the lordship. However, after Lorenzo's betrayals, Ricciarda was able to oust him from government in 1541. When their son Giulio came of age, he extorted the lordship from her (1546), but she took back the reins after his involvement in a pro-France plot (1547) and his decapitation in 1548. She continued to reign in Massa until her death in 1553. She was succeeded by her other son Alberico.

Children
Giulio I Cybo-Malaspina, Marquis of Massa (1525-1547) succeeded his mother in 1546. 
Alberico I Cybo-Malaspina, Prince of Massa (1534-1623) succeeded his mother following her death.

References

People from the Province of Massa-Carrara
1497 births
1553 deaths
Marquisses of Massa
Lords of Carrara
Ricciarda
Ricciarda
16th-century Italian women
16th-century women rulers